The pecan serpentine leafminer (Stigmella juglandifoliella) is a moth of the family Nepticulidae. It is found in Ohio, Pennsylvania and Kentucky in the United States.

The wingspan is 3.5-3.8 mm. There are probably two generations per year.

The larvae feed on Carya illinoinensis (pecan). They mine the leaves of their host plant. The mine consists of linear (serpentine) mines, just beneath the upper surface of the leaf. If the egg is laid near the center of the leaflet, the early bends of the resulting mine may lie around each other in a spiral because the larvae are unable to cross leaflet veins. If the egg is laid near the margin of the leaf, the mines will often follow leaflet margins.

External links
Species info at Bugwood
Nepticulidae of North America
A taxonomic revision of the North American species of Stigmella (Lepidoptera: Nepticulidae)

Nepticulidae
Moths of North America
Moths described in 1861